Menominee Tribe of Wis. v. United States, 577 U.S. ___ (2016), was a case in which the Supreme Court of the United States clarified when litigants are entitled to equitable tolling of a statute of limitations. In a unanimous opinion written by Justice Samuel Alito, the Court held that the plaintiff in this case was not entitled to equitable tolling of the statute of limitations because they did not demonstrate that "extraordinary circumstances" prevented the timely filing of the lawsuit.

Background
This case began as a contract dispute between the Menominee Tribe of Wisconsin and the federal government where the tribe alleged that the federal government failed to adequately fund aid programs under the Indian Self-Determination and Education Assistance Act of 1975. The federal government argued that the Tribe should not have been allowed to bring their claims because they were not filed within the Contract Disputes Act's six-year statute of limitations. The Tribe, on the other hand, argued that the statute of limitations should be equitably tolled because a similar class action suit was pending for 707 days before the Tribe filed suit. The United States District Court for the District of Columbia ruled that the Tribe was not entitled to equitable tolling because they did not demonstrate "extraordinary circumstances", which are a prerequisite for a claim for equitable tolling. On appeal, the United States Court of Appeals for the District of Columbia Circuit affirmed the district court's ruling, and the Supreme Court of the United States ultimately granted certiorari to resolve a circuit split about the circumstances under which litigants are entitled to equitable tolling.

Opinion of the Court
In a unanimous opinion written by Justice Samuel Alito, the Court held that the tribe was not entitled to equitable tolling of the statute of limitations. Citing Holland v. Florida, Justice Alito reaffirmed that litigants are only entitled to equitable tolling if they diligently pursue their claims and that "extraordinary circumstances" prevented timely filing. Citing Pace v. DiGuglielmo, Justice Alito also reaffirmed that these two factors are "elements" that should be considered together, and that they are "not merely factors of indeterminate or commensurable weight." Justice Alito held that the tribe did not demonstrate extraordinary circumstances in this case, and was therefore not entitled to equitable tolling.

Commentary and analysis
In his review of the case for SCOTUSblog, Ronald Mann observed that "the case is likely to cast a shadow over equitable tolling cases for years to come" and suggested that "[f]uture Indian tribes with similar problems may well wish that the tribe in this case had accepted its defeat at the court of appeals without pushing for such a stern limitation on the doctrine from the Supreme Court itself."

See also
 Menominee Tribe v. United States
 List of United States Supreme Court cases
 Lists of United States Supreme Court cases by volume
 List of United States Supreme Court cases by the Roberts Court

Notes

References

External links
 

United States Supreme Court cases
United States Supreme Court cases of the Roberts Court
2016 in United States case law
Menominee tribe
Statutes of limitations
United States Native American case law
Native American history of Wisconsin